Vittaria, the shoestring ferns, is a genus of ferns in the Vittarioideae subfamily of the family Pteridaceae.  It had previously been placed in the family Vittariaceae, but that family is no longer recognized.

Vittaria consists of epiphytes, with simple, entire, narrowly linear fronds. It comprises six species, five of which are native to the neotropics. Vittaria isoetifolia is native to tropical Africa and islands of the southwestern Indian Ocean. Vittaria isoetifolia and Vittaria lineata are known, albeit rarely, in cultivation.

Vittaria was named by James Edward Smith in 1793  in Mémoires de l'Académie Royale des Sciences (Turin). The generic name is derived from the Latin, vitta, meaning "a band or ribbon".

In 1990, Vittaria was defined broadly and estimated to have between 50 and 80 species. The genus is difficult to divide into species, and many of the species are only doubtfully distinct. In a 1997 revision of the vittarioid ferns, only 34 species were recognized in Vittaria sensu lato. Twenty of these were transferred to Haplopteris and eight to Radiovittaria, leaving only six in Vittaria.

Species 
Vittaria includes the following species:
 Vittaria appalachiana 
 Vittaria dimorpha  (= V. bradeorum )
 Vittaria flavicosta 
 Vittaria graminifolia 
 Vittaria isoetifolia 
 Vittaria lineata 
 Vittaria longipes 
 Vittaria scabrida  (doubtfully distinct from V. graminifolia)

Former species

Transferred to Haplopteris 
 Vittaria anguste-elongata  Hayata 
 Vittaria angustifolia  Blume 
 Vittaria doniana  Mettenius ex Hieron. 
 Vittaria elongata  Sw. 
 Vittaria ensiformis  Sw. 
 Vittaria flexuosa  Fée 
 Vittaria forrestiana  Ching 
 Vittaria fudzinoi  Makino 
 Vittaria guineensis  Desvaux 
 Vittaria hainanensis  C. Chr. ex Ching 
 Vittaria himalayensis  Ching 
 Vittaria longicoma  Christ 
 Vittaria malayensis  Holttum 
 Vittaria modesta  Handel-Mazzetti 
 Vittaria owariensis  Fée 
 Vittaria scolopendrina  (Bory) Schkuhr ex Thwaites 
 Vittaria sikkimensis  Kuhn 
 Vittaria taeniophylla  Copeland 
 Vittaria volkensii  Hieronymus 
 Vittaria zosterifolia  Willdenow

Transferred to Radiovittaria 

 Vittaria remota  Fée 
 Vittaria gardneriana  Fée 
 Vittaria latifolia  Benedict 
 Vittaria minima  (Baker) Benedict 
 Vittaria moritziana  Mettenius 
 Vittaria ruiziana  Fée 
 Vittaria stipitata  Kunze 
 Vittaria williamsii  Benedict

References

External links 
 Vittaria At: Plant Names At: IPNI
 CRC World Dictionary of Plant Names: R-Z At: Botany & Plant Science At: Life Science At: CRC Press
 The Plant List
 Smith's original diagnosis of the genus online at Project Gutenberg

Pteridaceae
Epiphytes
Fern genera
Taxonomy articles created by Polbot